The Forward Air Control Development Unit (FACDU) was a Royal Australian Air Force unit tasked with providing training in forward air control to RAAF pilots. It was formed in 2002 from No. 76 Squadron's C Flight and was merged with the RAAF Special Tactics Project on 3 July 2009 to form No. 4 Squadron.

References

RAAF independent flights
RAAF training units